Symphlebia muscosa is a moth in the subfamily Arctiinae. It was described by William Schaus in 1910. It is found in French Guiana, Venezuela, Peru, Panama and Costa Rica.

References

Moths described in 1910
Symphlebia